Vernon Palmer (Vernon Valentine Palmer) is an American-born legal scholar, the Thomas Pickles Professor of Law at Tulane University Law School and the co-director of its Eason Weinmann Center of Comparative Law. He is a specialist in civil law and mixed jurisdiction legal studies, with a primary focus on the study of comparative international law.

Palmer received in 2012 the degree of Docteur Honoris Causa by Paris-Dauphine University and received both the Palmes Académiques and, in 2006, the  Legion of Honor  from the French government. In 2022 he was honored by the International Academy of Comparative Law in Paris as one of the world's "great comparatists".

Biography

Palmer was born in New Orleans, Louisiana, and attended New Orleans Academy, Newman High School and graduated from Jesuit High School in 1958.

He is a graduate of Tulane University (B.A. 1962, LL.B. 1965 with Law Review Honors) and Yale Law School (LL.M. 1966), where he received a Sterling Fellowship. Palmer graduated from Pembroke College, Oxford University in 1985, where he received his Doctorate of Philosophy. His Oxford dissertation was an historical study entitled The Paths to Privity: The History of Third Party Beneficiary Contracts at English Law.

Publications 

He  is the author of numerous legal articles and books, including his most recent book "The Lost Translators of 1808 and the Birth of Civil Law in Louisiana (Georgia Univ. Press 2021). In addition to being active is his local New Orleans legal and political communities, Palmer has served as a constitutional advisor and consultant to the Kingdom of Lesotho and the Republic of Madagascar.

Selected books 
 Through the Codes Darkly—Slave Law and Civil Law in Louisiana (2012) 
 Mixed Jurisdictions Worldwide: The Third Legal Family (2012) 
 Mixed Jurisdictions Compared: The Private Law of Louisiana and Scotland (co-editor, Elspeth Reid) (2009)   
 The Civil Law of Obligations—Louisiana Law with European Comparisons (2010)   
 Pure Economic Loss Beyond Europe:  New Horizons in Comparative Law (co-editor, Mauro Bussani) (2008)   
 The Louisiana Civilian Experience: Critiques of Codification in a Mixed Jurisdiction (2005) 
 Strict Liability in Europe (co-editor, Franz Werro) (2004) 
 Pure Economic Loss in Europe (co-editor, Mauro Bussani) (2003) (translated into Chinese, Law Press China 2005)   
 Mixed Jurisdictions Worldwide: The Third Legal Family (2001) 
 Louisiana – Microcosm of a Mixed Jurisdiction (1999) 
 The Civil Law of Lease in Louisiana (1997) 
 'The Paths to Privity - The History of Third Party Beneficiary Contracts at English Law (1992) (reprinted Law Book Exchange 2006) 
 The Legal System of Lesotho (1972) (with Poulter) 
 The Roman-Dutch & Sesotho Law of Delict (1970) (reprint Morija Press 2006)

Selected articles 
 The Recusal of American Judges in the Post-Caperton Era: An Empirical Assessment of the Risk of Actual Bias in Decisions Involving Campaign Contributors
 Two Rival Theories of Mixed Legal Systems
 Double Reasoning in the Codified Mixed Systems - Code and Case Law as Simultaneous Methods
 The Comparative Law and Economics of Pure Economic Loss
 The Fate of the General Clause in a Cross-Cultural Setting: The Tort Experience of Louisiana (vol. 5.2, May 2001)
 Editorial - The Relevance and Allure of the Mixed Legal Systems (vol. 12, May 2008) Palmer, V.V., and M. Bussani
 Pure Economic Loss: The Ways to Recovery (vol. 11.3, December 2007)
 and John Levendis. The Louisiana Supreme Court in Question: An Empirical and Statistical Study of the Effects of Campaign Money on the Judicial Function Tul. L. Rev. 82 (2007): 1291.
 The Origins and Authors of the Code Noir La. L. Rev. 56 (1995): 363. 
 The French Connection and the Spanish Perception: Historical Debates and Contemporary Evaluation of French Influence on Louisiana Civil Law La. L. Rev. 63 (2002): 1067.

References 

Year of birth missing (living people)
Living people
Tulane University Law School faculty
American legal scholars
American lawyers
Tulane University Law School alumni